Cyrtodactylus fasciolatus, also known as the banded bent-toed gecko, is a species of gecko found in Northwest India (West Himalaya, Subathu/ Simla, Garhwal Hills, Almora, Kumaon, Himachal Pradesh).
Type locality: Subathu, Simla District.

References

 Blyth, E. 1861 Of lizards.. J. Asiatic Soc. Bengal xxix [1860]: 114-115
 Husain A.  Ray P. 1993 First record of Cyrtodactylus fasciolatus (Blyth), the bent- toed banded Gecko (Sauria: Gekkonida: Gekkoninae) from Garhwal Hills. J. Bombay Nat. Hist. Soc. 90 (3): 518  (1994)

Cyrtodactylus
Reptiles of India
Endemic fauna of India
Taxa named by Edward Blyth
Reptiles described in 1861